Neutral zone may refer to:
 Neutral zone (territorial entity) or an International zone

Sports 
 Neutral zone (cycling), a non-competitive segment of a few miles at the beginning of a bicycle race
 Neutral zone (gridiron football), the region between offensive and defensive sides prior to the snap of the ball on a scrimmage play
 Neutral zone (ice hockey), a zone between the blue lines in ice hockey

Star Trek 
 Neutral zone (Star Trek), a buffer zone between the territories of two different powers in the fictional Star Trek universe
 "The Neutral Zone" (Star Trek: The Next Generation), the finale of the first season of Star Trek: The Next Generation

Other uses
 Neutral zone (control theory) or deadband
 Neutral zone (dentistry), where the forces exerted by the muscles of the lips, cheek, and tongue are in balance

See also
 Demilitarized zone
 No man's land
 Neutral territory
 Overhead line#Neutral section (phase break) on which electric trains operate but which lacks the overhead lines that power them
 Saudi–Iraqi neutral zone
 Saudi–Kuwaiti neutral zone